Leningrad Cowboys go America is a 1989 album by the Finnish band Leningrad Cowboys and also the soundtrack of the film of the same name directed by Aki Kaurismäki.

Track listing

The German and Japanese track listings have a different order and add two additional tracks:

Musicians
Mato Valtonen - vocals
Sakke Järvenpää - vocals
Saku Kuosmanen - vocals
Silu Seppälä - bass guitar
Oinonen - guitar
Virtanen - guitar
Pimme Korhonen - drums
Mauri Sumén - keyboards, accordion

Single
"Thru the Wire" (Short Film) was released as a single in Germany to support this album

CD BMG Ariola, Choldwig/664 134 (Germany)
"Thru the Wire" (Short Film)
"L.A. Woman" (Short Film)
"Ballad of the Leningrad Cowboys"
"Mambo From Säkkijärvi"

References

Leningrad Cowboys albums
1989 soundtrack albums
Film soundtracks